Paul Frederic Löhr (born 14 January 2001) is a German professional footballer who plays as a goalkeeper.

Early life
Löhr was born in Kirn.

Career
Having joined the Karlsruher SC's academy in 2013, Löhr signed a contract until summer 2022 with the club in October 2020. He made his debut for the club as a late substitute in a 2–1 2. Bundesliga win over 1. FC Heidenheim on 23 May 2021. In June 2021, he suffered a tear of the meniscus and the cruciate ligament in the left knee, ruling him out for "at least eight months".

References

External links

2001 births
Living people
German footballers
Association football goalkeepers
Karlsruher SC players
2. Bundesliga players